Ahmed Suidani (‎; 1932–1994) was a Syrian soldier and politician.

Born in Daraa in the Hauran region of Syria, Suidani became one of the most prominent Ba'athists in the Syrian Arab Army, and a close confidant of Syrian presidents Amin al-Hafiz and Salah Jadid. Following the 1963 Syrian coup d'état, Suidani was assigned to head the Syrian Intelligence Directorate under president al-Hafiz. Following the 1966 Syrian coup d'état, Suidani was promoted to the rank of major general (Liwa) and given command of the Syrian Arab Army under president Jadid. He also personally led the operation uncovering of the Israeli spy Eli Cohen in 1965.

After the Six-Day War defeat against Israel in 1967, Suidani blamed Syrian minister of defense Hafez Al-Assad for the loss of the Golan Heights, and a quarrel erupted within Syrian high command. Suidani wrote a report denouncing Al-Assad, but Al-Assad persevered and countered by accusing Suidani of fomenting a coup, with some 100 officers from the Hauran, resulting in Suidani being relieved from his duties in 1968. He attempted an escape to Iraq, but was captured in 1969 at Damascus International Airport. Suidani was imprisoned for 25 years and died in his hometown shortly after his release in 1994.

Media depictions
Ahmed Suidani was portrayed by Alexander Siddig in the Netflix TV series The Spy.

References

1932 births
1994 deaths
20th-century Syrian politicians
Syrian military personnel
People from Daraa